The 1992–93 Nationalliga A season was the 55th season of the Nationalliga A, the top level of ice hockey in Switzerland. 10 teams participated in the league, and EHC Kloten won the championship.

Regular season

Playoffs

Quarterfinals

EHC Kloten - EHC Biel 4:0 
Game 1: EHCK-EHCB 8:1
Game 2: EHCB-EHCK 1:4
Game 3: EHCK-EHCB 6:2
Game 4: EHCB-EHCK 2:4

HC Lugano - EV Zug 4:1 
Game 1: HCL-EVZ 3:2
Game 2: EVZ-HCL 0:3
Game 3: HCL-EVZ 2:1
Game 4: EVZ-HCL 4:2
Game 5: HCL-EVZ 4:0

SC Bern - HC Ambrì-Piotta 1:4 
Game 1: SCB-HCAP 3:4
Game 2: HCAP-SCB 5:1
Game 3: SCB-HCAP 4:2
Game 4: HCAP-SCB 3:2
Game 5: SCB-HCAP 2:3

HC Fribourg-Gottéron - Zürcher SC 4:0 
Game 1: HCFG-ZSC 4:3
Game 2: ZSC-HCFG 3:4
Game 3: HCFG-ZSC 8:4
Game 4: ZSC-HCFG 4:6

Semifinals

EHC Kloten - HC Lugano 3:1 
Game 1: EHCK-HCL 1:3
Game 2: HCL-EHCK 1:2 SO
Game 3: EHCK-HCL 5:1
Game 4: HCL-EHCK 2:4

HC Fribourg-Gottéron - HC Ambrì-Piotta 3:1 
Game 1: HCFG-HCAP 9:2
Game 2: HCAP-HCFG 2:6
Game 3: HCFG-HCAP 1:2
Game 4: HCAP-HCFG 2:4

Final

EHC Kloten - HC Fribourg-Gottéron 3:0 
Game 1: EHCK-HCFG 4:2
Game 2: HCFG-EHCK 4:7
Game 3: EHCK-HCFG 4:2

Relegation

Round 1

HC Davos - EHC Bülach 4:0 
Game 1: HCD-EHCB 6:5
Game 2: EHCB-HCD 1:8
Game 3: HCD-EHCB 9:0
Game 4: EHCB-HCD 1:3

EHC Chur - HC Martigny 4:1 
Game 1: EHCC-HCM 5:0
Game 2: HCM-EHCC 7:5
Game 3: EHCC-HCM 4:1
Game 4: HCM-EHCC 4:8
Game 5: EHCC-HCM 7:2

EHC Olten - SC Herisau 4:0 
Game 1: EHCO-SCH 5:4
Game 2: SCH-EHCO 2:3
Game 3: EHCO-SCH 4:1
Game 4: SCH-EHCO 3:4

HC Ajoie - SC Rapperswil-Jona 0:4 
Game 1: HCA-SCRJ 4:6
Game 2: SCRJ-HCA 5:2
Game 3: HCA-SCRJ 3:4
Game 4: SCRJ-HCA 6:2

Round 2

HC Davos - EHC Chur 3:0 
Game 1: HCD-EHCC 4:0
Game 2: EHCC-HCD 3:4
Game 3: HCD-EHCC 4:3

EHC Olten - SC Rapperswil-Jona 3:0 
Game 1: EHCO-SCRJ 4:3
Game 2: SCRJ-EHCO 3:4
Game 3: EHCO-SCRJ 8:4

HC Davos and EHC Olten were promoted to the Nationalliga A. HC Ajoie and EHC Chur were relegated to the Nationalliga B.

External links
 Championnat de Suisse 1992/93

1992–93 in Swiss ice hockey
Swiss